Pavel Mareš (born 18 January 1976) is a Czech former professional footballer who played as a defender at either centre-back or left-back. He played top-league football in the Czech Republic for Bohemians Prague and Sparta Prague, and played for Zenit Saint Petersburg in the Russian Football Premier League.

Mareš played in ten matches as part of the Czech Republic national football team between 2002 and 2006. He played at Euro 2004 as his nation reached the semi-final stage of the competition. Mareš also travelled to Germany as part of the national team for the 2006 FIFA World Cup.

Club career

Early career
Mareš played for Czech 2. Liga side FC Svit Zlín before moving to Prague in 1999. He first played top-level football with Bohemians Prague in the 1999–2000 season, and made 58 appearances for Bohemians over two-and-a-half seasons. He signed for Sparta Prague in December 2001 after defender Vladimír Labant had left the club. Mareš sustained an ankle injury in his second match for Sparta Prague after his transfer, which caused him to be unavailable for Sparta's European Champions League game against Porto. In December 2002, Sparta rejected an approach from Russian side Zenit Saint Petersburg to sign Mareš. In spite of that, Zenit's Czech manager Vlastimil Petržela, who had been manager when Mareš played for Bohemians, made Mareš his third Czech signing later the same month.

Russia
From 2003 to 2006, Mareš played for Zenit Saint Petersburg. He scored his first goal for that club in July 2003 in a 2–2 draw against Krylia Sovetov Samara. During his time in St. Petersburg, the club finished second in the 2003 Russian Premier League and reached the quarter finals of the 2005–06 UEFA Cup. In the 2006 season, Mareš suffered an ankle injury, causing him to miss matches in March and April. Following the arrival of Dick Advocaat as Zenit's manager the same season, Mareš played much less than before. In August 2006, Mareš agreed to a contract to play for English club Bolton Wanderers, however the deal was not completed, with his agent citing a failed medical as the reason for the breakdown. In January 2007, he left Zenit despite another year remaining on his contract.

Return to the Czech Republic
Mareš returned to Sparta Prague on a two-and-a-half-year contract in January 2007, going on to play two league matches for Sparta in the 2006–07 season but no matches in 2007–08. He spent the first half of the 2008–09 season in the Czech 2 Liga playing for Sparta's reserve team, which he captained. He transferred to Vysočina Jihlava, which played in the same league, midway through the season. Mareš spent six months in Jihlava before leaving the club at the end of the season, citing its failure to win promotion to the Czech First League as his reason for doing so. During his time in Jihlava, injuries limited him to two appearances for the club.

In the summer of 2009, Mareš was one of nine players to join Viktoria Žižkov, as the club prepared to return to the top league following their relegation. This move again reunited him with manager Vlastimil Petržela, but injuries restricted him to two appearances in the first half of the 2009–10 season. Later in 2010, Mareš played for FC Přední Kopanina in the Czech Fourth Division.

International career
Mareš first played for the Czech Republic in 2002, and later returned to the national team before a friendly match against Japan in April 2004, having played in no international matches since the February 2002 tournament in Cyprus. He played for the Czech Republic at Euro 2004, where the team reached the semi-finals. His only appearance in the tournament was in a group match against Germany among a group of players the BBC described as "very much a Czech second string". Mareš was part of the Czech Republic squad for the 2006 FIFA World Cup, but did not play in the tournament. He finished his career having played ten matches for the Czech Republic between 2002 and 2006.

Playing style
Mareš was a defender who could play as a centre-back or left-back. Following his nomination for the Czech Republic's 2006 World Cup squad, Reuters described Mareš as "reliable backup to [Marek] Jankulovski, but less supporting in the attack".

Personal life
Mareš' parents are called Jindřiška and Bohuslav. He has an older brother, Jan, with whom he grew up. Mareš' son, Dominik, currently plays for Pardubice.

Career statistics

International
Source:

References

External links
 
 
 

Living people
1976 births
Association football defenders
Czech footballers
Czech expatriate footballers
Czech Republic international footballers
Czech First League players
FC Fastav Zlín players
Bohemians 1905 players
AC Sparta Prague players
FC Vysočina Jihlava players
FK Viktoria Žižkov players
Russian Premier League players
FC Zenit Saint Petersburg players
UEFA Euro 2004 players
2006 FIFA World Cup players
Expatriate footballers in Russia
Sportspeople from Zlín